Roseline Éloissaint (born 20 February 1999) is a Haitian footballer who plays as a winger for Division 2 Féminine club Nantes and the Haiti national team.

International goals
Scores and results list Haiti's goal tally first

References

External links 
 

1999 births
Living people
Women's association football wingers
Haitian women's footballers
People from Nippes
FC Nantes (women) players
Haiti women's international footballers
Haitian expatriate footballers
Haitian expatriate sportspeople in Canada
Expatriate women's soccer players in Canada
Haitian expatriate sportspeople in France
Expatriate women's footballers in France
A.S. Blainville players